Daisy Cooks! is a half-hour cooking show on PBS starring Daisy Martinez which features Spanish-Caribbean, Puerto Rican, and Mexican cuisine and their preparation.

Episodes 
(cf. sample show listings)

 Dad's Firehouse Dinner
 Mexico Magico
 A Trip to Cuba
 World of Latin Seafood
 Fast & Fresh I: Grandma's Pork Chops
 Empanadas
 Tapas
 ---
 Lunch at the Beach
 ---
 One Pot Meal (Caldo Gallego)
 Mexican Classics
 Cocktail Party
 Pasta Latino
 Media Hora 2
 Spanish Classics (chicken & Figs)
 Sweet Endings
 Fast & Fresh 2 - Swordfish
 Paella
 In Praise of Beans
 Praise Of El Pollo
 Christmas Eve At Daisy's
 Partytime
 Dominican Specialties
 Feast Day In Puerto Rico
 That's Dookie

Notes 

American cooking television series
PBS original programming